Harbord Harbord, 1st Baron Suffield (26 January 1734 – 4 February 1810), known as Sir Harbord Harbord, Bt, between 1770 and 1786, was a British landowner and politician who sat in the House of Commons from 1756 to 1784 when he was raised to the peerage as Baron Suffield.

Biography

Harbord was born Harbord Morden at Thorpe, Norfolk, the eldest son of William Morden, later Sir William Harbord, 1st Baronet, and his wife Elizabeth Britiffe, daughter of Robert Britiffe, Recorder of Norwich. His father assumed by royal licence the surname of Harbord in lieu of Morden in 1742 according to the will of his maternal uncle, Harbord Harbord.

Harbord sat as Member of Parliament for Norwich from 1756 to 1786. He succeeded his father in the baronetcy in 1770. In 1775 Harbord commissioned James Wyatt to make significant additions to the Gunton Hall, the family's country house. In 1786 he was raised to the peerage as Lord Suffield, Baron of Suffield, in the County of Norfolk.

Lord Suffield married Mary Assheton, daughter of Sir Ralph Assheton, 3rd Baronet, in 1760. He died in February 1810, aged 76, and was succeeded in the baronetcy and barony by his eldest son, William. His younger son Edward was a radical politician and anti-slavery campaigner.

Arms

References

1734 births
1810 deaths
Peers of Great Britain created by George III
Members of the Parliament of Great Britain for English constituencies
British MPs 1754–1761
British MPs 1761–1768
British MPs 1768–1774
British MPs 1774–1780
British MPs 1780–1784
British MPs 1784–1790
People from Thorpe St Andrew
People from North Norfolk (district)
Harbord